Bittacus strigosus, the striped scorpionfly, is a species of hangingfly in the family Bittacidae, living in North America.

References

External links

 

Bittacus
Articles created by Qbugbot
Insects described in 1861
Insects of North America